Kazimierz Raszewski (29 February 1864 – 14 January 1941) was a lieutenant general of the Polish Army.

Early life 
Raszewski was born 29 February 1864 in a small village called Jasień near Poznań (Czempiń Municipal), in the Province of Posen in the Kingdom of Prussia. Kazimierz was the second son of a szlachta (Polish landed gentry) Ignacy Raszewski and Józefa Koczorowska. An ancestor, Kazimierz Turno, was a general of the Army of the Duchy of Warsaw.

In 1827, he started attending the Real School in Poznań. He later moved to the Saint Mary Magdalene School. In 1884, he finished school in Bolesławiec.

Military career 
He started his military career in 1885 by joining the 2. Schlesische Husaren-Regiment Nr. 6 in Prudnik. The commander of the Regiment in Prudnik was lieutenant Rosenberg, a friend of Raszewski's father with whom he served in the Husaren-Regiment Nr. 1 in Milicz. Due to Raszewski's Polish descent, he was being mocked by other soldiers. After many years, in his autobiography, he stated that he wouldn't become an officer without the support he received from Rosenberg while in Prudnik.

After graduating from military school in Nysa in 1887, he came back to Prudnik as a second lieutenant and became the commander of the platoon. In 1892, he married Olga Luchs. The couple had a son Lambert (born 1893) and a daughter Izabela (1894–1917).

In 1894, he was moved to 1. Schlesische Husaren-Regiment Nr. 4 in Oława. In 1913, he joined the Husaren-Regiment Nr. 16 in Schleswig. During World War I, he served on Western and Eastern Front.

In 1918, he joined the Armia Wielkopolska to fight in the Greater Poland uprising. He later participated in the Polish–Soviet War.

Promotions 
 Second Lieutenant – 1887
 Lieutenant – 1895
 Rittmeister – 1901
 Major – 1913
 Lieutenant Colonel – 21 January 1918
 Colonel – 1919
 Lieutenant General – 21 April 1920

Honours and awards 
 Silver Cross of the Order of Virtuti Militari
 Commander's Cross of the Order of Polonia Restituta
 Cross of Valour, two times
 Krzyż na Śląskiej Wstędze Waleczności i Zasługi
 Gold Cross of Merit
 War Medal 1918-1921
 Decade of Independence Regained
 Iron Cross
 Great Officer of the Order of St. Sava
 Commandeur of the Legion of Honour
 Officier of the Legion of Honour
 Order of Merit

References 

1864 births
1941 deaths
Polish generals of the Second Polish Republic
Commanders of the Order of Polonia Restituta
Recipients of the Silver Cross of the Virtuti Militari
Recipients of the Cross of Valour (Poland)
Recipients of the Gold Cross of Merit (Poland)
Recipients of the Iron Cross (1914), 1st class
Great Officers of the Order of St. Sava
Commandeurs of the Légion d'honneur
Officiers of the Légion d'honneur
Polish people of World War I
Polish monarchists
19th-century Polish nobility
Greater Poland Uprising (1918–1919) participants
Polish people of the Polish–Soviet War
Military personnel from Poznań
20th-century Polish nobility